Gvardeysk, known prior to 1946 by its German name , is a town and the administrative center of Gvardeysky District in Kaliningrad Oblast, Russia, located on the right bank of the Pregolya River  east of Kaliningrad. Population figures:  It is located within the historic region of Sambia.

History

Peter of Dusburg wrote of a settlement known as Tapiow, first documented in 1254, and the neighboring fort Surgurbi built by 1265. The Old Prussian names were derived from the words tape, teplu, toplu, tapi, meaning "warm", and sur garbis, meaning "around the mountain". During the 13th century Prussian Crusade, the area was conquered by the Teutonic Knights. To protect Samland from the Nadruvians and Scalvians, the crusaders built a wooden fort between the Deime and Pregel Rivers in 1283–1290. This was replaced by Tapiau Castle, a stone Ordensburg, in 1351.

The settlement gradually became known by the German crusaders as Tapiau. Vytautas, the later Grand Duke of Lithuania, was baptized in Tapiau in 1385. Upon the request of the anti-Teutonic Prussian Confederation in 1454 Polish King Casimir IV Jagiellon incorporated the region and town to the Kingdom of Poland and the Thirteen Years' War broke out. After the defeat of the Teutonic Knights in the war, in 1466, the town became part of Poland as a fief held by the Teutonic Knights. After the transfer of the Grand Master's seat from Malbork to Königsberg, Tapiau became the site of the Order's archives and library from 1469 to 1722.

Tapiau became a part of the Duchy of Prussia, a vassal state of Poland, in 1525. The Tapiau Castle was often used as a second residence of the Prussian dukes; Albert of Prussia died there in 1568. It became a part of the Kingdom of Prussia in 1701, receiving town privileges from King Frederick William I of Prussia in 1722. It became a part of the newly established Prussian Province of East Prussia in 1773 and was administered in Landkreis Wehlau (1818–1945). Tapiau became a part of the German Empire during the unification of Germany in 1871.

In August 1939, the Germans imprisoned the principal, teachers, other staff and 162 students of the Polish gymnasium in Kwidzyn in the town. They were held in the former psychiatric hospital. In September 1939, during the German invasion of Poland, which started World War II, it was converted into a prisoner-of-war camp for Polish POWs, and Polish teachers and youth were deported elsewhere. Later on, students under the age of 18 were released, older students were forcibly conscripted to the Wehrmacht, while teachers and staff were deported to Nazi concentration camps, where most of them were murdered. Also a Nazi prison for women was operated in the town.

Unlike most other towns in northern East Prussia, Tapiau was largely undamaged during World War II. Following the war's end in 1945, it was annexed by the Soviet Union and renamed Gvardeysk ("guard town") in 1946. The town's German population of more than 9,000 either fled or were killed during the war, and those remaining after the war were expelled and gradually replaced by Soviet residents.

Administrative and municipal status

Within the framework of administrative divisions, Gvardeysk serves as the administrative center of Gvardeysky District. As an administrative division, it is, together with one rural locality (the settlement of Prigorodnoye), incorporated within Gvardeysky District as the town of district significance of Gvardeysk.

Within the framework of municipal divisions, since June 11, 2014, the territories of the town of district significance of Gvardeysk and of four rural okrugs of Gvardeysky District are incorporated as Gvardeysky Urban Okrug. Before that, the town of district significance was incorporated within Gvardeysky Municipal District as Gvardeyskoye Urban Settlement.

Coat of arms
The coat of arms of Gvardeysk depicts a bare hand holding a sword amongst clouds, beneath a golden sun. When the town was known as Tapiau before 1946, the golden sun also included the Tetragrammaton (Jehova-Sonne).

Sights
Sights of Gvardeysk include a church from 1502 and the ruined Tapiau Castle, reconstructed into an orphanage in 1879. It has been used as a prison since 1945.

People
Tapiau's most famous resident was the German Impressionist painter Lovis Corinth (1858–1925), who donated the painting Golgatha for the altar of the town's church in 1910; the painting disappeared near the end of World War II. The house where Corinth was born still stands in Gvardeysk. Other notable people associated with the town include Albert, Duke of Prussia (1490–1568), who died in Tapiau.

References

Notes

Sources

External links

Official website of Gvardeysk  
Gvardeysk Business Directory 

Cities and towns in Kaliningrad Oblast
Castles of the Teutonic Knights
Castles in Russia
Gvardeysky District
Renamed localities in Russia